John Mitchel's GAC Claudy is a Gaelic Athletic Association club based in Claudy, County Londonderry, Northern Ireland. The club is a member of Derry GAA and currently caters for Gaelic football. The club is named after Irish patriot and revolutionary John Mitchel, as is that in Glenullin in the same county. John Mitchel's Claudy GAC is the oldest club in County Londonderry and celebrated its 125th anniversary in 2013.

Claudy fields boys' and girls' football teams at Under-6, U-8 and U-10; boys'/men's teams at U-12, U-14, U-16, Minor, Reserve and Senior levels; and ladies teams at Under-12, U-14, U-16 and Senior levels. Underage teams up to U-12s play in North Derry league and championships, from U-14 upwards teams compete in All-Derry competitions. The club currently competes in the Derry Senior Football Championship and Division 1 of the Derry All-County Football League.

2018 Championship Football

2017 Championship Football

History
The North Derry County Board held a meeting in St Patrick's Hall, Claudy in 1921, but was forced to disperse after coming under gun attack from the A Specials.  Many GAA members were interned without trial. This had the effect of bringing Gaelic games in the area to a standstill.

In the early 1930s Alfie Devine from the village tried to encourage the establishment of the GAA in Claudy and also tried to organise a North Derry County Board. John Mitchel's GAC was founded and the opening game was played in July 1934 against Craigbane Lamh Dhearg. The North Derry Board was formed in 1936. After being a member of the North Derry Board for a short while, the club affiliated to the Derry City Board in 1935. In 1946 the club moved back to the North Derry Board.

Mitchel's first major success came in 1957 when they won the Dr Kerlin Cup, defeating Ballerin, who won the Derry Senior Football Championship that year. The club won the North Derry Minor Football Championship two years later, before being beaten by Magherafelt in the All-Derry Minor Championship final.

The 1960s proved to be one of Claudy's most successful decades ever. In that time they won the North Derry Senior Football League a few times, Neal Carlin Cup, Mahon Cup and reached a Derry Senior Championship semi-final, where they were beaten by Newbridge.

The club's biggest success came in 2005 when they defeated Eoghan Rua in the final of the Derry Intermediate Football Championship.

Football titles

Adult
Derry Intermediate Football Championship: 1
2005
Derry Junior Football Championship: 1
1983
Dr Kerlin Cup 7
1957, 1970, 1975, 1985, 1990, 2013, 2015

Under 21s
Harry O'Kane Cup (North derry)  2
 2013, 2014

Reserve
Derry Intermediate Reserve Football Championship: 3
2000, 2007, 2019

Minor
North Derry Minor 'A' Football Championship: 2
1992, 1999
North Derry Minor 'A' Football League: 4
1990, 1991, 1999, 2000
North Derry Minor 'B' Football Championship: 2
2007
North Derry Minor 'B' Football League: 1
2001
Carlin Duffy Cup: 1
2012
Derry Minor 'B' Football league:2
2013,2014
Derry Minor 'B' Football Championship:2
2014, 2018

Under-16
North Derry Under-16 'B' Football Championship: 1
 1997
 North Derry Under-16 'B' Football League: 2
 2001, 2008

Under-14
 North Derry Under-14 'B' Football Championship
 1992
 North Derry Under-14 'B' Football League
 1999 
Derry Under-14 'C' Football League 
2019

>Note: The above lists may be incomplete. Please add any other honours you know of.

Notable footballers
Patsy Gormley - Goalkeeper on Derry's 1958 All-Ireland Senior Football Championship runners-up side.

See also
List of Gaelic games clubs in Derry

External links
John Mitchel's GAC website

References

Gaelic games clubs in County Londonderry
Gaelic football clubs in County Londonderry